Federico Andrade (born 18 September 1940) is a Colombian diver. He competed in the men's 3 metre springboard event at the 1960 Summer Olympics.

References

External links
 

1940 births
Living people
Colombian male divers
Olympic divers of Colombia
Divers at the 1960 Summer Olympics
People from Palmira, Valle del Cauca
Sportspeople from Valle del Cauca Department
20th-century Colombian people